The Battle of Vienna took place at Kahlenberg Mountain near Vienna on  1683 after the imperial city had been besieged by the Ottoman Empire for two months. The battle was fought by the Holy Roman Empire (led by the Habsburg monarchy and the Polish–Lithuanian Commonwealth, both under the command of King John III Sobieski) against the Ottomans and their vassal and tributary states. The battle marked the first time the Commonwealth and the Holy Roman Empire had cooperated militarily against the Ottomans, and it is often seen as a turning point in history, after which "the Ottoman Turks ceased to be a menace to the Christian world". In the ensuing war that lasted until 1699, the Ottomans lost almost all of Hungary to the Holy Roman Emperor Leopold I.

The battle was won by the combined forces of the Holy Roman Empire and the Polish–Lithuanian Commonwealth, the latter represented only by the forces of the Crown of the Kingdom of Poland (the march of the Lithuanian army was delayed, and they reached Vienna after it had been relieved). The Viennese garrison was led by Feldzeugmeister of the Imperial Army (Holy Roman Empire) Ernst Rüdiger Graf von Starhemberg, an Austrian subject of Holy Roman Emperor Leopold I. The overall command was held by the senior leader, the king of Poland, John III Sobieski, who led the relief forces.

The opposing military forces were those of the Ottoman Empire and its vassal states, commanded by Grand Vizier Merzifonlu Kara Mustafa Pasha. The Ottoman army numbered approximately 90,000 to 300,000 men (according to documents on the order of battle found in Kara Mustafa's tent, initial strength at the start of the campaign was 170,000 men). They began the siege on 14 July 1683. Ottoman forces consisted, among other units, of 60 ortas of Janissaries (12,000 men paper-strength) with an observation army of some 70,000 men watching the countryside. The decisive battle took place on 12 September, after the arrival of the united relief army.

Historians maintain that the battle marked the turning point in the Ottoman–Habsburg wars, a 300-year struggle between the Holy Roman and Ottoman Empires. During the 16 years following the battle, the Austrian Habsburgs gradually recovered and dominated southern Hungary and Transylvania, which was largely cleared of Ottoman forces. The battle is noted for including the largest known cavalry charge in history.

Prelude
Capturing the city of Vienna had long been a strategic aspiration of the Ottoman Empire, because of its interlocking control over Danubian (Black Sea to Western Europe) southern Europe and the overland (Eastern Mediterranean to Germany) trade routes. During the years preceding this second siege (the first was the 1529 siege of Vienna), the Ottoman Empire, under the auspices of the Grand Vizier Kara Mustafa Pasha, undertook extensive logistical preparations, including the repair and establishment of roads and bridges leading into the Holy Roman Empire and its logistical centers, as well as the forwarding of ammunition, cannon, and other resources from all over the Empire to these centers and into the Balkans. 
Since 1679 the plague had been raging in Vienna. The battle would have been sooner had it not been for the 1566 Battle of Szigeth which stopped the Ottoman Empire for a while.

On the political front, the Ottoman Empire had been providing military assistance to the Hungarians and non-Catholic minorities in Habsburg-occupied portions of Hungary. There, in the years preceding the siege, widespread unrest had grown into open rebellion against Leopold I's pursuit of Counter-Reformation principles and his desire to crush Protestantism. In 1681 Protestants and other anti-Habsburg Kuruc forces, led by Imre Thököly, were reinforced with a significant military contingent from the Ottomans, who recognized Thököly as King of "Upper Hungary" (the eastern part of today's Slovakia and parts of northeastern Hungary, which he had earlier taken by force from the Habsburgs). This support included explicitly promising the "Kingdom of Vienna" to the Hungarians if it fell into Ottoman hands. Yet before the siege, a state of peace had existed for 20 years between the Holy Roman Empire and the Ottoman Empire as a result of the Peace of Vasvár.

In 1681 and 1682 clashes between the forces of Imre Thököly and the Holy Roman Empire (the border of which was then northern Hungary) intensified, and the incursions of Habsburg forces into central Hungary provided the crucial argument of Grand Vizier Kara Mustafa Pasha in convincing Sultan Mehmed IV and his Divan to allow the movement of the Ottoman army. Mehmet IV authorized Mustafa Pasha to operate as far as Győr (then known as Yanıkkale, and in German as Raab) and Komárom (in Turkish Komaron, Komorn in German) Castles, both in northwestern Hungary, and to besiege them. The Ottoman army was mobilized on 21 January 1682 and war was declared on 6 August 1682.

The logistics of the time meant it would have been risky or impossible to launch an invasion in August or September 1682, since a three-month campaign would have taken the Ottomans to Vienna just as winter set in. But the 15-month gap between mobilization and the launch of a full-scale invasion provided ample time for Vienna to prepare its defense and for Leopold to assemble troops from the Holy Roman Empire and form an alliance with Poland, Venice and Pope Innocent XI. This undoubtedly contributed to the failure of the Ottoman campaign. The decisive alliance of the Holy Roman Empire with Poland was concluded in the 1683 Treaty of Warsaw, by which Leopold promised to support Sobieski if the Ottomans attacked Kraków, and in return, the Polish army would come to the relief of Vienna if it were attacked.

On 31 March, another declaration—sent by Grand Vizier Merzifonlu Kara Mustafa Pasha on behalf of Mehmet IV—arrived at the Imperial Court in Vienna. The next day the forward march of Ottoman army elements began from Edirne in Rumelia. Ottoman troops reached Belgrade by early May. They were joined by a Transylvanian army under Prince Mihaly Apafi and a Hungarian force under Imre Thököly; they laid siege to Győr and the remaining army of 150,000 moved toward the city of Vienna. Emperor Leopold fled Vienna for Passau with his court and 60,000 Viennese, while Charles V, Duke of Lorraine, withdrew his force of 20,000 towards Linz. The main Ottoman army arrived at Vienna on 14 July; the city's only defense force was now that of Count Ernst Rüdiger von Starhemberg's 15,000 men. Saxon engineer Georg Rimpler, who had been employed by the empire to prepare for war with the Turks, quickly hurried to prepare Vienna for the upcoming siege – much of Austria's pre-war plans had calculated on fighting the Turks near the city of Győr, a plan made untenable by the Turkish advance.

The king of Poland, John III Sobieski, prepared a relief expedition to Vienna during the summer of 1683, so honoring his obligations to the treaty (he left his own nation virtually undefended when departing from Kraków on 15 August). He covered this with a stern warning to Imre Thököly, the leader of Upper Hungary, whom he threatened with destruction if he tried to take advantage of the situation—which Thököly in fact attempted. Jan Kazimierz Sapieha the Younger delayed the march of the Lithuanian army, devastating the Hungarian Highlands (now Slovakia) instead, and arrived in Vienna only after it had been relieved.

Immediately tensions rose between Poland and the various German states – mainly Austria – over the relief of the city. Payment of troops' wages and supplies while marching was predominant among these. Sobieski insisted that he should not have to pay for his march to Vienna, since it was by his efforts that the city had been saved; nor could the Viennese neglect the other German troops who had marched. The Habsburg leadership hurriedly found as much money as possible to pay for these and arranged deals with the Polish, to limit their costs.

Events during the siege

The main Ottoman army finally laid siege to Vienna on 14 July. On the same day, Kara Mustafa sent the traditional demand that the city surrender to the Ottoman Empire. Ernst Rüdiger Graf von Starhemberg, leader of the remaining 15,000 troops and 8,700 volunteers with 370 cannons, refused to capitulate. Only days before, he had received news of the mass slaughter at Perchtoldsdorf, a town south of Vienna, where the citizens had handed over the keys of the city after having been given a similar choice but were killed anyway. Siege operations started on 17 July.

The Viennese had demolished many of the houses around the city walls and cleared the debris, leaving an empty plain that would expose the Ottomans to defensive fire if they tried to rush into the city. Kara Mustafa Pasha tried to solve that problem by ordering his forces to dig long lines of trenches directly toward the city, to help protect them from the defenders as they advanced.

The Ottomans had 130 field guns and 19 medium-caliber cannon, insufficient in the face of the defenders' 370. Mining tunnels were dug under the massive city walls, which would then be filled with sufficient quantities of black powder to blow up the walls. According to Andrew Wheatcroft, the outer palisade was around 150 years old and mostly rotten, so the defenders set to work knocking very large tree trunks into the ground to surround the walls. This seriously disrupted the Ottoman plan, adding almost another three weeks to the time it would take to get past the old palisade. This, combined with the delay in advancing their army after declaring war, eventually allowed a relief force to arrive in September. Historians have speculated that Kara Mustafa wanted to take the city intact with its riches and declined an all-out attack, not wishing to initiate the plundering that would accompany an assault, which was viewed as the right of conquering soldiers.

The Ottoman siege cut virtually every means of food supply into Vienna. Fatigue became so common that von Starhemberg ordered any soldier found asleep on watch to be shot.

The forces were also joined by several mercenary regiments of Zaporozhian Cossacks hired by the Polish–Lithuanian Commonwealth. Louis XIV of France declined to help his Habsburg rival, having just annexed Alsace.

An alliance between Sobieski and Emperor Leopold I resulted in the addition of the Polish hussars to the existing allied army. The leadership of the forces of European allies was entrusted to the Polish king, who had under his command 70,000–80,000 soldiers facing an Ottoman army of 150,000. Sobieski's courage and remarkable aptitude for command were already known in Europe.

The Viennese tried to counter this by digging their own tunnels to intercept the placing of large amounts of gunpowder in caverns. The Ottomans finally managed to occupy the Burg ravelin and the low wall in that area on 8 September. Anticipating a breach in the city walls, the remaining Viennese prepared to fight in the inner city.

Ottoman casualties during the siege (17 July – 12 September 1683)

In this table, only household and retinue troops’ numbers are certain, 78,500 and 44,200 while other troops’ numbers are round, 50,000 Tatars, 10,000 Wallachian, 170,000 rear service etc. Based on this, Kahraman Şakul claim that this anonymous table show counted numbers of household and retinue troops while number of provincial troops (Tımarlı Sipahi: 40,000) and vassal states’ troops (100,000) is expected numbers. For instance, Tatars, Nogais and Circassians number was more than 100,000 while this table show that Tatars (general term for Crimean Khanate and its vassals) brought 50,000 warriors.

According to Austrian Ambassador Kunitz, Ottoman besieging army already decreased to 90,000 combatant as of 12 August and he said that he learned from Ottoman captives casualties of Ottoman soldiers reaching 20,000 at end of the August (other Austrian sources gives Ottoman casualties as 12,000 until 13 August, demonstrating steady increase in casualites of Ottoman army in the days of siege). A Ottoman list captured after battle recorded casualties as 48.544 until 10 September: 10,000 janissary, 12,000 sipahi (elite heavy cavalry), 16,000 beldar (digger), 6,000 engineer (in Turkish lağımcı: miner), 2,000 provincial sipahi and 2,000 Tatars totaled 48,544 death. Desertion (Ottoman sources and Marsili gives 1/4 desertion of Ottoman army) and diseases also diminished Ottoman army on a large scale. According to Ottoman sources, number of army decreased from 120,000 (according to Kunitz, Ottoman army was 180,000 combatant and 1/3 of army stationed around, especially to siege Győr and Komárom castles) to warweary 28.400 soldiers and 12,000 soldiers in trenches, totaling 40,000 soldiers. K. Şakul combines Kunitz's 90,000 combatant information for 12 August with Ottoman casualties list, estimating Ottoman army as 90,000 men (65,000 soldiers, around 60 guns and 25,000 rear service) but Kunitz's 90,000 combatant information belongs to 12 August while Ottoman list is for 10 September. Ottoman Christian vassals (Transylvania, Wallachia and Moldavia) were allocated to hold withdrawal bridges, thus they didn't participate the battle. Muslim Vassals, Tatars were expected to battle effectively by Ottomans but mostly irregular Tatar horsemen demonstrated no effectiveness in battle like other battles in the past and future. 50,000 or 28,400 Ottoman army alone battled against relief army consisted of 65-68,000 soldiers with 165-200 guns.

Staging the battle

The relief army had to act quickly to save the city and prevent another long siege. Despite the multinational composition of the army and the short space of only six days, an effective leadership structure was established, centred on the king of Poland and his heavy cavalry (Polish Hussars) only, as the promised Lithuanian contingents arrived too late for the battle. The Holy League settled the issues of payment by using all available funds from the government, loans from several wealthy bankers and noblemen and large sums of money from the Pope. The Habsburgs and Poles also agreed that the Polish government would pay for its own troops while still in Poland, but that the Emperor would pay them once they crossed into imperial territory. However, the Emperor had to recognize Sobieski's claim to first rights of plunder of the enemy camp in the event of a victory.

Kara Mustafa Pasha was less effective at ensuring the motivation and loyalty of his forces, and in preparing for the expected relief-army attack. He had entrusted defense of the rear to the khan of Crimea and his cavalry force, which numbered between 30,000 and 40,000. There is doubt as to how much the Tatars participated in the final battle before Vienna. Their khan refused to attack the relief force as it crossed the Danube on pontoon bridges and also refused to attack them as they emerged from the Vienna Woods. The Ottomans also could not rely on their Wallachian and Moldavian allies. George Ducas, Prince of Moldavia, was captured, while Șerban Cantacuzino's forces joined the retreat after Sobieski's cavalry charge.

The confederated troops signalled their arrival on the Kahlenberg above Vienna with bonfires. The forces in the city of Vienna responded by sending Jerzy Franciszek Kulczycki, a Polish nobleman, diplomat and trader fluent in Turkish, on a successful spy mission to penetrate the Turkish forces and notify the relief troops of when the joint attack was to be made. Before the battle a Mass was celebrated, said by Marco d'Aviano, the religious adviser of Emperor Leopold I.

Battle

The battle started before all units were fully deployed. At 4:00 am on 12 September, the Ottomans attacked, seeking to interfere with the deployment of Holy League troops. The Germans were the first to strike back. Charles of Lorraine moved forward with the imperial army on the left and other imperial forces in the center and, after heavy fighting and multiple Ottoman counterattacks, took several key positions, specifically the fortified villages of Nussdorf and Heiligenstadt. By noon the imperial army had already severely mauled the Ottomans and come close to a breakthrough. Though shattered, the Ottoman army did not crumble at that moment.

Mustafa Pasha launched his counterattacks with most of his force, but held back some of the elite Janissary and Sipahi units for a simultaneous assault on the city. The Ottoman commanders had intended to take Vienna before Sobieski arrived, but time ran out. Their sappers had prepared a large, final detonation under the Löbelbastei to breach the walls. In total, ten mines were set to explode, but they were located by the defenders and disarmed.

In the early afternoon, a great battle started on the other side of the battlefield as the Polish infantry advanced on the Ottoman right flank. Instead of concentrating on the battle with the relief army, the Ottomans continued their efforts to force their way into the city. That meant the Poles could make good progress, and by 4:00 pm they had taken the village of Gersthof, which would serve as a base for their massive cavalry charge. The Ottomans were in a desperate position, between Polish and Imperial forces. Charles of Lorraine and John III Sobieski both decided, on their own, to continue the offensive and finish off the enemy.

The imperial forces resumed the offensive on the left front at 3:30 pm. At first, they encountered fierce resistance and were stopped. This did not last long, however, and by 5:00 pm they had made further gains and taken the villages of Unterdöbling and Oberdöbling. They were now very close to the central Ottoman position (the "Türkenschanze"). As they were preparing to storm it, they could see the Polish cavalry in action.

It is recorded that the Polish cavalry slowly emerged from the forest to the cheers of the onlooking infantry, which had been anticipating their arrival. At 4:00 pm the hussars first entered into action, obliterating the Ottoman lines and approaching the Türkenschanze, which was now threatened from three sides (the Poles from the west, the Saxons and the Bavarians from the northwest and the Austrians from the north). At that point, the Ottoman vizier decided to leave this position and retreat to his headquarters in the main camp further south. However, by then many Ottomans were already leaving the battlefield.

The allies were now ready for the last blow. At around 6:00 pm, the Polish king ordered the cavalry attack in four groups, three Polish and one from the Holy Roman Empire—18,000 horsemen charged down the hills, the largest cavalry charge in history. Sobieski led the charge at the head of 3,000 Polish heavy lancers, the famed "Winged Hussars". The Muslim Lipka Tatars who fought on the Polish side wore a sprig of straw in their helmets to distinguish them from the Tatars fighting on the Ottoman side. The charge easily broke the lines of the Ottomans, who were exhausted and demoralized and soon started to flee the battlefield. The cavalry headed straight for the Ottoman camps and Kara Mustafa's headquarters, while the remaining Viennese garrison sallied out of its defenses to join in the assault.

The Ottoman troops were tired and dispirited following the failure of the attempt at sapping, the assault on the city and the advance of the Holy League infantry on the Türkenschanze. The cavalry charge was the final deadly blow. Less than three hours after the cavalry attack, the Catholic forces had won the battle and saved Vienna. The first Catholic officer who entered Vienna was Louis William, Margrave of Baden-Baden, at the head of his dragoons. Afterwards Sobieski paraphrased Julius Caesar's famous quotation (Veni, vidi, vici) by saying "Venimus, vidimus, Deus vicit"- "We came, we saw, God conquered".

Aftermath

Contemporary Ottoman historian Silahdar Findiklili Mehmed Agha (1658–1723) described the battle as an enormous defeat and failure for the Ottoman Empire, the most disastrous since the foundation of Ottoman statehood in 1299. The Ottomans lost at least 20,000 men during the siege, while their losses during the battle with Sobieski's forces amounted to around 15,000 dead (according to Podhorodecki) or 8,000–15,000 dead and 5,000–10,000 captured (according to Tucker). Casualties of the allied relief force under Sobieski's command were much smaller, amounting to approximately 3,500 dead and wounded, including 1,300 Poles. Tucker's estimate is slightly higher: 4,500. The 10,000 strong Viennese garrison and the civilian populace lost, due to all causes, about half of their initial number during the siege.

The Holy League troops and the Viennese took a large amount of loot from the Ottoman army, which Sobieski vividly described in a letter to his wife a few days after the battle:
They must run for their sheer lives . . . General Starhemberg hugged and kissed me and called me his saviour. 

Starhemberg immediately ordered the repair of Vienna's severely damaged fortifications to guard against a possible Ottoman counterstrike. Vienna was never again besieged by the Ottoman Empire.

Soon the Ottomans disposed of their defeated commander. On 25 December Kara Mustafa Pasha was executed in Belgrade in the approved manner—by strangulation with a silk rope pulled by several men on each end—by order of the commander of the Janissaries.

Despite the victory of the Catholic allies, there was still tension among the various commanders and their armies. For example, Sobieski demanded that Polish troops be allowed to have the first choice of the spoils of the Ottoman camp. German and Austrian troops were left with smaller portions of the loot. Also, the Protestant Saxons, who had arrived to relieve the city, were apparently subjected to verbal abuse by the Catholic populace of the Viennese countryside. The Saxons left the battle immediately, without partaking in the sharing of spoils, and refused to continue the pursuit.

Sobieski went on to liberate Grau and northwestern Hungary after the Battle of Parkany, but dysentery halted his pursuit of the Ottomans. Charles V took Belgrade and most of Serbia in 1686 and established Habsburg control over southern Hungary and most of Transylvania in 1687.

The Ottoman defeat at Vienna sparked great celebrations in Safavid Iran; the report was apparently brought in such a spectacular way, that then incumbent Emperor (Shah) Suleiman I (1666–1694) considered a march to Baghdad, which had been lost in 1639 to the Ottomans by virtue of the Treaty of Zuhab. Ultimately, the Safavids did not conduct a new campaign, for concerned state officials (notably the dominant eunuch faction within the royal court) were aware of the decline in Safavid military strength, and thus did not consider it prudent. The eunuchs, according to Professor Rudi Matthee "were not against the idea of having the Ottomans suffer some humiliation, but they did not want their power destroyed for fear that this would remove a buffer against Christian Europe".

Significance

The victory at Vienna set the stage for the reconquest of Hungary and (temporarily) some of the Balkan lands in the following years by Louis of Baden, Maximilian Emmanuel of Bavaria and Prince Eugene of Savoy. The Ottomans fought on for another 16 years, losing control of Hungary and Transylvania in the process before finally desisting. The Holy Roman Empire signed the Treaty of Karlowitz with the Ottoman Empire in 1699. The battle marked the historic end of Ottoman imperial expansion into Europe. The actions of Louis XIV of France furthered French–German enmity; in the following month, the War of the Reunions broke out in the western part of the weakened Holy Roman Empire.

Because Sobieski had entrusted his kingdom to the protection of the Blessed Virgin (Our Lady of Częstochowa) before the battle, Pope Innocent XI commemorated his victory by extending the feast of the Holy Name of Mary, which until then had been celebrated solely in Spain and the Kingdom of Naples, to the entire Church; it used to be celebrated on the Sunday within the Octave of the Nativity of Mary (between 9 and 15 September) and was, when Pope Pius X intended to make room for the celebration of the actual Sundays, transferred to 12 September, the day of the victory. The Pope also upgraded the papal coat of arms by adding the Polish crowned White Eagle. After victory in the Battle of Vienna, the Polish king was also granted by the Pope the title of "Defender of the Faith" ("Defensor Fidei"). In honor of Sobieski, the Austrians erected a church atop the Kahlenberg hill north of Vienna.

See also
 Great Turkish War
 History of Vienna
 Ottoman wars in Europe
 Scutum: a constellation named in 1684 in reference to the battle
 The Day of the Siege: September Eleven 1683, a 2012 English-language Polish and Italian historical drama film based on the Battle of Vienna and directed by Renzo Martinelli

Notes

References

Further reading
 Stéphane Gaber, Et Charles V arrêta la marche des Turcs, Presses universitaires de Nancy, 1986, .
 
 Cezary Harasimowicz Victoria Warsaw 2007, novel 
 James Michener Poland, A Novel, see Chapter V From the South Alan Palmer, The Decline and Fall of the Ottoman Empire, Published by Barnes & Noble Publishing, 1992. .
 Wheatcroft, Andrew.  The Enemy at the Gate: Habsburgs, Ottomans and the Battle for Europe. New York, NY: Basic Books, 2010. .

External links

 Polish–Lithuanian Commonwealth Army in the 17th century  from kismeta.com
 The Battle of Vienna at the Wilanów Museum Palace
  German TV: Türken vor Wien
  Arte TV: Türken vor Wien
 Winged Hussars, Radoslaw Sikora, Bartosz Musialowicz, BUM Magazine'', 2016.
 "The Real Battle of Vienna", by Dag Herbjørnsrud, Aeon, 24 July 2018.

Conflicts in 1683
17th century in Austria
Battles of the Great Turkish War
Battles involving the Ottoman Empire
Battles involving Poland
Battles involving Moldavia
Battles involving Transylvania
Battles involving Wallachia
Military history of the Habsburg monarchy
Battles involving the Holy Roman Empire
Sieges involving the Holy Roman Empire
Battles involving Austria
Sieges involving the Ottoman Empire
Military history of Austria
Austria–Turkey relations
Cavalry charges
1683 in the Ottoman Empire
1683 in the Habsburg monarchy
17th century in Vienna